De Soto National Forest, named for 16th-century Spanish explorer Hernando de Soto, is  of pine forests in southern Mississippi.  It is one of the most important protected areas for the biological diversity of the Gulf Coast ecoregion of North America.

It is a nationally important site for protection of longleaf pine savannas, pine flatwoods, and longleaf pine forests. More than 90 percent of this ecosystem type has been lost in the United States.   The wet pine savannas support rare and endangered plant and animal species, such as the orchid Calopogon multiflorus, gopher frogs, and gopher tortoises. These habitats also have numerous carnivorous plants, particularly pitcher plants; Buttercup Flats has an international reputation in this regard.

This national forest also offers year-round opportunities for outdoor activities, including camping, canoeing, bird-watching, photography, hunting, fishing, and more. There are two nationally significant wilderness areas within DeSoto: Black Creek Wilderness and Leaf River Wilderness. Black Creek is a popular stream for canoeing, camping, and fishing, and is Mississippi's only designated National Wild and Scenic River.

The forest headquarters office is in Jackson, the state capital, as are those for all six national forests in Mississippi. The local ranger district office is in Wiggins, which is surrounded by the national forest on three sides: north, east, and south.

De Soto National Forest is located between Hattiesburg and Gulfport, and can be easily accessed by U.S. Highway 49 and U.S. Highway 98. It lies in parts of ten counties. In descending order of land area they are Perry, Wayne, Harrison, Forrest, Stone, Greene, Jones, Jackson, George, and Pearl River counties.

See also 
De Soto National Memorial, on the west coast of Florida
List of U.S. National Forests
Brooklyn, Mississippi
Perry County, Mississippi
Black Creek Wilderness
Red Creek
Red Creek Wildlife Management Area (Mississippi)
Leaf River Wildlife Management Area
Gopher Farm sandhill

References

External links 
 National forests in Mississippi
 Longleaf pine conservation
 savannas and carnivorous plants

 
National Forests of Mississippi
Protected areas of Perry County, Mississippi
Protected areas of Wayne County, Mississippi
Protected areas of Harrison County, Mississippi
Protected areas of Forrest County, Mississippi
Protected areas of Stone County, Mississippi
Protected areas of Greene County, Mississippi
Protected areas of Jones County, Mississippi
Protected areas of Jackson County, Mississippi
Protected areas of George County, Mississippi
Protected areas of Pearl River County, Mississippi
1936 establishments in Mississippi
Protected areas established in 1936